Słudwia is a river in Central Poland. Its source is located near the village of Długołęka. The river flows for  through the Kutno Plains, before joining the Bzura near the town of Łowicz. The river is best known for the 1928 Maurzyce Bridge built across it, the first welded road bridge in the world, designed by Stefan Bryła.

References

Rivers of Poland
Rivers of Łódź Voivodeship